Pankaj Chhagan Bhujbal is an Indian politician and member of Nationalist Congress Party, was elected as member of Maharashtra Legislative Assembly twice from Nandgaon. He is the son of veteran politician and mass base leader Chhagan Bhujbal.

Terms in office 
2009-2014: Elected to Maharashtra Legislative Assembly (1st term)

2014-2019: Re-elected to Maharashtra Legislative Assembly (2nd term)

References

Maharashtra MLAs 2014–2019
Corruption in Maharashtra
Nationalist Congress Party politicians from Maharashtra
Living people
Marathi politicians
Year of birth missing (living people)